The New Evening Post (Chinese: 新晚報) was a Hong Kong newspaper.  It was the evening edition of Ta Kung Pao.  It started printing on October 15, 1950 and stopped printing on July 27, 1997.

The famous novelist Jin Yong was an editor there in 1952. Jin Yong later founded Ming Pao.

Namesake
In August 2012, a namesake free tabloid newspaper was launched by a company that was chaired by Ha Ping. In 2014 it was ceased publication.

References 

Publications established in 1950
Defunct newspapers published in Hong Kong
Publications disestablished in 1997
1950 establishments in Hong Kong